Hits from the Bow is the debut studio album by the Santa Cruz deathcore act Arsonists Get All the Girls, released February 6, 2006 through Process Records. Re-released on January 27, 2009.

Allusions
The name of the album is likely a parody of the title of the Cypress Hill song Hits from the Bong.

The title of the song "Scobra vs. Cupcake: Battle of the Bulge" is a reference to Robert Scobie (ex-Moria drummer) and Joel Haston (the band's tour manager).

Track listing
 "This Time You're Going to Get It Dirty Shirley" - 2:56
 "Red Meat & Big Trucks" - 3:09
 "Scobra vs. Cupcake: Battle of the Bulge" - 4:09
 "Shat Shart Tart" - 2:35
 "Zombies Ate My Neighbors" - 2:45
 "Jazzy Geoffrey" - 0:44
 "Sinsinatti" - 4:22
 "Canadian Unigog" - 2:13
 "Limbo" - 3:21
 "City of Angels Cakewalk" - 3:59

Personnel
Arsonists Get All the Girls
Cameron Reed - vocals, keyboard
Remi Rodberg - vocals, keyboard
Patrick Mason - bass
Arthur Alvarez - guitar
Garin Rosen - drums

2006 debut albums
Arsonists Get All the Girls albums